All-Ireland Senior Championship may refer to a number of sports competitions organised by the Gaelic Athletic Association:

 All-Ireland Senior Camogie Championship, in the women's field sport of game of camogie played in Ireland
 All-Ireland Senior Football Championship, the premier competition in Gaelic football in Ireland
 All-Ireland Senior Hurling Championship
 All-Ireland Senior Ladies' Football Championship
 All-Ireland Senior Club Camogie Championship, in the Irish women's field sport of camogie
 All-Ireland Senior Club Football Championship, an annual Gaelic football tournament
 All-Ireland Senior Club Hurling Championship, an annual inter-county hurling competition
 All-Ireland Ladies Club Football Championship, the ladies; competition for club football teams